Joseph Édouard Barès (27 November 1872 – 27 August 1954) was a French general and a pioneer of military aviation. A veteran of the First World War, he later served three time as Chief of Staff of the French Air Force.

Biography 
Joseph Édouard Barès was born on 27 November 1872 in Azul, Argentina from French parents.

Barès entered the École Spéciale Militaire in 1892 and graduated in 1894, choosing the Marine Infantry arm. He was affected to three different regiments and was finally promoted to the rank of Lieutenant. He participated to the Second Madagascar expedition in 1895. He then entered the École Supérieure de Guerre in 1896 where he changed is path of career to the regular Infantry of the French Army. With the development of military aviation, he joined the air service of the Army in several infantry regiments and was made a Knight of the Legion of Honour on 14 October 1911 for his exceptional services to the Military Aeronautics.

On 13 September 1914, General Joseph Joffre appointed Barès Director of the Aeronautical Service (Directeur du Service Aéronautique) at the Grand Quartier Général. A proponent of the offensive against the German Industries, Barès pioneered aerial bombing, but forbade attacks against cities and civilian targets. In September 1915 he was promoted to lieutenant colonel, but with the appointment of General Robert Nivelle as commander-in-chief of the French armies in December 1916, Barès was replaced by Paul du Peuty. On 15 February 1917 Barès assumed the post of air commander of the eastern front, with particular responsibility for the sector of Verdun.

Barès was promoted to Général de Brigade on 20 March 1923 and was put in command of an air brigade. In the 1930s, as a Général de division, Joseph Barès was two times Chief of Staff of the Air Forces, before becoming Chief of Staff of the Air Army in 1934 with its official creation as an independent branch of the French Armed Forces. He retired the same year after more than 40 years of service. In December 1936, then Minister of the Air Pierre Cot awarded him the Military Medal, an honour rarely bestowed on general officers.

Général Barès died on 27 August 1954 in Aspet, France.

Honours and decorations

Military ranks

Bibliography 
Le général Barès: "créateur et inspirateur de l'aviation", Nouvelles Editions Latines, 1994

References

External links 
 Service records of General Barès

1872 births
1954 deaths
French generals
Grand Croix of the Légion d'honneur
Military aviation leaders of World War I
Chiefs of the Staff of the French Air and Space Force